Darupey (also Romanized as Darūpey, Daroopey, and Darow Pay) is a village in Kolijan Rostaq-e Olya Rural District, Kolijan Rostaq District, Sari County, Mazandaran Province, Iran. At the 2006 census, its population was 212, in 54 families.

References 

Populated places in Sari County